The South American fur seal (Arctocephalus australis) breeds on the coasts of Peru, Chile, the Falkland Islands, Argentina, Uruguay and Brazil. The total population is around 250,000. However, population counts are sparse and outdated. Although Uruguay has long been considered to be the largest population of South American fur seals, recent census data indicates that the largest breeding population of A. a. australis (that breeds in Chile, the Falkland Islands, Argentina, Uruguay) are at the Falkland Islands (estimated pup abundance ~36,000)  followed by Uruguay (pup abundance ~31,000). The population of South American fur seals in 1999 was estimated at 390,000, a drop from a 1987 estimate of 500,000 - however a paucity of population data, combined with inconsistent census methods, makes it difficult to interpret global population trends.

Description
South American fur seals have a dark grey or brown coat of fur. Adult males are much larger than females, with thicker necks and larger shoulders. Males also develop manes of longer guard hairs on their neck and shoulders.
Size of the seals varies based on region, but on average, adult males measure up to 2 m long and weigh 150–200 kg and females measure up to 1.5 m long and weigh 30–60 kg. Newborns are 60 to 65 cm and 3.5 to 5.5 kg.

Distribution and habitat
The South American fur seal is found on neotropical ocean coasts from the Paracas Peninsula of southern Peru south to Cape Horn on the Pacific coast, and northward to southern Brazil on the Atlantic coast. They are also found on the Falkland Islands, Staten Island, and Escondida Island. 
A. australis seals prefer rocky shores and islands, particularly those with steep slopes. They have been found in sea caves in Peru, where some climb up to 15 m to find a spot to rest. There have been isolated records from continental Ecuador, the Galápagos Islands, and the Gorgona Island (Colombia). 
Anatomical information for the southern fur seals, Arctocephalus spp., is scant. In addition, little is known about the foraging ecology of South American fur seals. Recent tracking studies reveal that South American fur seals breeding at the Falkland Islands use a vast area of the Patagonian Shelf.

Subspecies
Two subspecies are currently recognised:
 A. a. australis - Falkland Islands
 A. a. gracilis - South America

The New Zealand fur seal is sometimes considered a subspecies of A. australis.

References

External links

Fur seal preys on penguin 

Arctocephalus
Pinnipeds of South America
Mammals of Argentina
Mammals of Chile
Mammals of Peru
Mammals of Patagonia
Carnivorans of South America
Least concern biota of South America
Mammals described in 1783
Taxa named by Eberhard August Wilhelm von Zimmermann